Trodin On is the first LP released by the reggae artist Gentleman, produced by The Diamond Crew.

Track listing 
 "Heat Of The Night" (featuring Richie Stephens & Mighty Tolga) – 3:41
 "Tek Time Fi Grow " (featuring Meli) – 4:47
 "Jah Jah Never Fail" (featuring Terry Linen) – 3:22
 "Fade Away" – 4:13
 "Lion" (featuring Mighty Tolga) – 4:19
 "Outa Space" – 3:12
 "War & Crime" (featuring Jack Radics) – 4:33
 "Human Being" – 3:10
 "True Love" (featuring Brooke Russell) – 4:44
 "A Who Dem Want Blame" – 3:50
 ""No Competition"" – 3:32
 "Right Side Of Life" – 3:53
 "Allstar Jam" (featuring Max Herre, Afrob, Ju & Sékou) – 4:10
 "Trodin On" (featuring Sékou & Max Herre) – 4:06

Trodin On
Trodin On